Colonel Effingham's Raid (UK title: Man of the Hour) is a 1946 American comedy film directed by Irving Pichel. It is also known as Berry Fleming's Colonel Effingham's Raid, Everything's Peaches Down in Georgia and Rebel Yell. The screenplay was written by Kathryn Scola, based on a 1943 novel by Berry Fleming. The music score is by Cyril J. Mockridge. The film stars Charles Coburn, Joan Bennett and William Eythe. The plot involves a retired career Army colonel who returns to his hometown, starts writing a column in a local newspaper and takes on the corrupt local politicians to not replace the historic county courthouse.

Fleming based his novel on the Cracker Party and political corruption in Richmond County, Georgia.

Plot
Newly retired United States Army Colonel William Seaborn Effingham (Charles Coburn) returns to his home town of Fredericksville, Georgia, in 1940. He meets his second cousin, once removed, Albert Marbury (William Eythe), a reporter for the Leader newspaper.

The next day, Confederate Memorial Day, Mayor Bill Silk (Thurston Hall) announces he intends to rename the town Confederate Monument Square after an undistinguished deceased politician named Pud Toolen. Effingham persuades a reluctant Earl Hoats (Allyn Joslyn), the editor of the Leader, to let him write a war column (for free). Effingham soon attacks the mayor's plan in his column, much to Hoats' dismay. The rival News is getting most of the advertising revenue due to its friendly attitude toward the complacent local government, and Hoats had been trying to combat that.

Silk decides to use Effingham, agreeing to the latter's beautification scheme for the square, but also deciding to tear down the old courthouse (and giving his brother-in-law Bill the contract to erect the new one). When Effingham learns about the plan, he fights for the courthouse’s restoration. He brings in expert Major Hickock to evaluate the condition of the building.
 
The mayor responds by calling a town meeting, hoping that no one will show up. But Effingham alerts residents about the meeting in his column, and many townsfolk attend. The mayor claims the town will get 1/3 of the cost paid for by the Works Progress Administration if a new courthouse is built, but nothing for repairs. When uncomfortable questions are still asked, the mayor hastily adjourns the meeting. Effingham checks out the claims, and finds out that none of what the mayor said is true. Silk, however, refuses to call a second meeting.

Despite the lack of support from the newspaper's staff, with the sole exception of Ella Sue Dozier, Effingham is undeterred. He talks to the key townspeople, but they refuse to help him, and his spirit is finally broken.

Cousin Albert, who has enlisted in the National Guard (in an effort to impress Ella Sue), realizes that Effingham is right. When the local Guard unit is called up by the federal government, the mayor starts to make an empty speech, but the crowd is hostile. Albert lashes out, demanding that the courthouse be repaired and the square left alone. With the townsfolk solidly behind him, he forces the mayor to give in to his demands, and Effingham's old friends admit he was right after all.

Cast

Charles Coburn as  Col. Will Seaborn Effingham 
Joan Bennett as  Ella Sue Dozier 
William Eythe as  Albert 'Al' Marbury 
Allyn Joslyn as Earl Hoats
Elizabeth Patterson as  Cousin Emma 
Donald Meek as  Doc Buden 
Frank Craven as  Dewey 
Thurston Hall as  Ed, the Mayor 
Cora Witherspoon as  Mrs. Clara Meigs 
Emory Parnell as  Joe Alsobrook 
Henry Armetta as Jimmy Economy 
Stephen Dunne as Prof. Edward 'Ed' Bland 
Roy Roberts as Army Capt. Rampey

Notes

External links

 
 
 
 

1946 films
1946 comedy films
American black-and-white films
Films about journalists
Films based on American novels
Films directed by Irving Pichel
Films scored by Cyril J. Mockridge
Films set in 1940
Films set in Georgia (U.S. state)
20th Century Fox films
Articles containing video clips
American comedy films
Films with screenplays by Kathryn Scola
1940s English-language films
1940s American films